Colfax Township is a township in Champaign County, Illinois, USA.  As of the 2020 census, its population was 219 and it contained 109 housing units.

History
Colfax Township formed from Tolono Township in 1869.

Geography
Colfax is Township 18 North, Range 7 East of the Third Principal Meridian.

Blue Mound, a glacial kame in Section 7, is the highest point in the township. A pole barn and a few trees are all that remain of the farmstead that once occupied the site.

Unincorporated towns
 Giblin
(This list is based on USGS data and may include former settlements.)

Cemeteries
The township contains six cemeteries: Craw, Davis Memorial, Deadman's Grove, Dunkard, Dunn and Saint Boniface.

Demographics
As of the 2020 census there were 219 people, 37 households, and 6 families residing in the township. The racial makeup of the township was 87.67% White, 0.00% African American, 0.00% Native American, 3.65% Asian, 0.00% Pacific Islander, 0.46% from other races, and 8.22% from two or more races. Hispanic or Latino of any race were 2.28% of the population.

There were 37 households, out of which 0.00% had children under the age of 18 living with them, 16.22% were married couples living together, none had a female householder with no spouse present, and 83.78% were non-families. 83.80% of all households were made up of individuals, and none had someone living alone who was 65 years of age or older. The average household size was 1.97 and the average family size was 7.00.

The township's age distribution consisted of 0.0% under the age of 18, 21.9% from 18 to 24, 0% from 25 to 44, 60.2% from 45 to 64, and 17.8% who were 65 years of age or older. The median age was 53.5 years. For every 100 females, there were 43.1 males. For every 100 females age 18 and over, there were 43.1 males.

References
 
 United States Census Bureau cartographic boundary files

External links
 US-Counties.com
 City-Data.com
 Illinois State Archives

Townships in Champaign County, Illinois
Townships in Illinois